Ancylosis anguinosella is a species of snout moth in the genus Ancylosis. It was described by Zeller, in 1848. It is found in Russia and Kazakhstan.

References

Moths described in 1848
anguinosella
Moths of Europe
Moths of Asia